Cathy Marshall is a Principal Researcher in Microsoft Research's Silicon Valley Lab. She is affiliated with the Center for Study of Digital Libraries at Texas A&M University. She has led a series of projects investigating analytical work practices and collaborative hypertext, including two system development projects, Aquanet (named after the hairspray) and VIKI. Marshall is mainly interested in studying human interaction when mediated by technology. From her early experiences with hypertext, Marshall discovered the negative effects of having analysts work with formal representation. Marshall learned that information which does not fit in formal representation gets lost as people try to force it into this area. Cathy has a 20-year history working with hypertext.

Career 
Between 1993 and 1996, while working with PARC, Judy Malloy and Cathy Marshall collaborated on Forward Anywhere: Notes on an Exchange between Intersecting Lives, a hypernarrative work based on electronic communication that passed between the two in which they sought "to exchange the remembered and day-to-day substance of our lives". In the essay, "Closure was never a goal in this piece," the two, (Judy Malloy and Cathy Marshall) share their experiences and thoughts about collaborating in "Forward Anywhere," excerpts of which can be found in the site itself. She has also produced works such as "Do Tags Work?" which is a narrative on the effectiveness of archive tagging on the internet. She worked at Xerox PARC for 11 years and Fuji Xerox Palo Alto Lab for one year. Cathy Marshall was also an adjunct professor in the Computer Science Department at Texas A&M University.

Selected bibliography
 Forward Anywhere,  Eastgate Systems (1993) with Judy Malloy
 Reading and Writing the Electronic Book, Morgan & Claypool (2009)
 Who Owns Social Media Content? (2016)

References

External links
Profile page for Center for the Study of Digital Libraries at Texas A&M University
Microsoft Research webpage (2009 archived version)
 "Cathy Marshall Interview" ACM SIGWEB Newsletter, Winter, January 2009

20th-century births
Living people
Microsoft employees
Scientists at PARC (company)
Year of birth missing (living people)
Electronic literature writers